University Place  may refer to:

 University Place (Chapel Hill, North Carolina), a shopping mall formerly known as University Mall
 University Place, Manchester, a building of the University of Manchester, England
 University Place (Manhattan), a street in Manhattan, New York City
 University Place (Orem, Utah)
 University Place, Washington, a city in the State of Washington